Beveridge Webster (May 13, 1908, in Pittsburgh, Pennsylvania – June 30, 1999, in Hanover, New Hampshire) was an American pianist and educator.

Biography
Beveridge Webster initially studied with his father, who was director of the Pittsburgh Conservatory of Music. In 1921, at the age of fourteen, he began five years of study in Europe, first at the American Academy at Fontainebleau, then at the Paris Conservatory with Isidor Philipp and Nadia Boulanger. He also studied in Berlin with Artur Schnabel.

He made his New York debut in November 1934 with the New York Philharmonic performing Edward MacDowell's Piano Concerto No. 2. In 1937, he gave the New York Philharmonic premiere (on short notice, replacing Dushkin) of Stravinsky's Capriccio, under Stravinsky's baton.

Perhaps best known as an interpreter of French composers, especially Maurice Ravel, Webster gave premieres or made first recordings of many contemporary works, including pieces by Louise Talma, Roger Sessions, Roy Harris, Aaron Copland and Elliott Carter. In 1968, over a three-concert series at The Town Hall, he commemorated the 50th anniversary of Claude Debussy's death with the first complete survey of the composer's piano works in New York.

A Time magazine article from 1937 said of Webster, "Dark, well-knit, young Beveridge Webster is a good swimmer, takes pride in his tennis, likes to play poker or bridge with his great good friend Igor Stravinsky. He boasts of the little slam he once made against Sidney Lenz."

He taught at New England Conservatory from 1940 to 1946 and at the Juilliard School from 1946 to 1990. His students include Michel Block, Robert McDonald, Jahja Ling, Sylvia Glickman, Steven Graff and Hao Huang.  He made a substantial series of recordings issued on LP by Dover Publications and at least one, billed as the first installment in a complete traversal of Schubert's piano sonatas, for MGM Records, released as E3711.

Beveridge Webster had two children. One of them is Michael Webster, former principal clarinet of the Rochester Philharmonic Orchestra. He played under the baton of Aaron Copland for a performance of Copland's clarinet concerto. Michael Webster now teaches at the Shepherd School at Rice University in Houston, Texas.

References

External links
David Dubal interview with Beveridge Webster, WNCN-FM, May 11, 1984
David Dubal interview with Beveridge Webster, WNCN-FM, May 18, 1984
Beveridge Webster's recording of Louise Talma's Six Etudes for Piano

American classical pianists
American male pianists
Musicians from Pittsburgh
American music educators
Piano pedagogues
Conservatoire de Paris alumni
1908 births
1999 deaths
Pupils of Isidor Philipp
20th-century classical pianists
20th-century American pianists
Educators from Pennsylvania
Classical musicians from Pennsylvania
20th-century American male musicians